Uncial 071 (in the Gregory-Aland numbering), ε 015 (Soden), is a Greek uncial manuscript of the New Testament, dated paleographically to the 5th or 6th century. It came from Oxyrhynchus.

Description 
The codex contains a small part of the Gospel of Matthew 1:21-24; 1:25-2:2, on one parchment leaf (7 cm by 9.5 cm). It is written in one column per page, 13 lines per page.

Currently it is dated by the INTF to the 5th or 6th century.

 Text
The Greek text of this codex is a representative of the Alexandrian text-type, in close relationship with Codex Sinaiticus, Vaticanus, and Dublinensis. Aland placed it in Category II.

 Textual variants
Matt 1:24
 εγερθεις – א, B, C, Z, 071, f1
 διεγερθεις – C3, D, L, W, 087, f13, mss of the Byzantine text-type

Matt 1:25

 υἱὸν (son) – א, B, Z, 071, f1, f13, 33
 τὸν υἱὸν αὐτῆς τὸν πρωτότοκον (her firstborn son) – C, D, K, L (omit αὐτῆς), W, Δ, Π, 28, 565, 700, 892, 1009, 1010, 1071, 1079, 1195, 1216, 1230, 1241, 1242, 1365

 Present location
The codex is now located in the Semitic Museum (3735) at Harvard University, Cambridge, Massachusetts.

See also 

 List of New Testament uncials
 Textual criticism
 Papyrus Oxyrhynchus
 Papyrus Oxyrhynchus 400
 Papyrus Oxyrhynchus 402

References

Further reading 
 

Greek New Testament uncials
5th-century biblical manuscripts
6th-century biblical manuscripts
401